Sucker Lake is an endorheic lake in the municipality of Assiginack, Manitoulin District in Northeastern Ontario, Canada. It has three islands, the largest of which is named Maple island, and there is a prevalent population of brown trout near a shoal off Bubs Island. The lake can be accessed from Sucker Lake Road, which connects to Ontario Highway 6.

See also
List of lakes in Ontario

References

Lakes of Manitoulin Island